is a Japanese tarento, actress, idol, and former fashion model. She is represented with Rising Production.

Asahi is a member of the idol group Maintenance. She was a former member of the idol group Idoling!!! Asahi also appears regularly on television variety programs.

Filmography

TV series
Regular appearances

TV dramas

Anime

Internet series

Internet drama

Films

Stage

Advertisements

Magazines

Delivery applications

Events

As a member of Maintenance

Internet series

Events

References

External links

 
Open Cast Video blogs 

Japanese television personalities
Japanese idols
Japanese female models
Idoling!!! members
1994 births
Living people
People from Hamura, Tokyo
People from Saitama Prefecture
21st-century Japanese actresses